Mamudovci is a village in the municipality of Kičevo, North Macedonia.

Demographics
As of the 2021 census, Mamudovci had 232 residents with the following ethnic composition:
Albanians 228
Persons for whom data are taken from administrative sources 4

According to the 2002 census, the village had a total of 401 inhabitants. Ethnic groups in the village include:
Albanians 400 
Macedonians 1

References

External links

Villages in Kičevo Municipality
Albanian communities in North Macedonia